Wilfred Benítez vs. Sugar Ray Leonard was a professional boxing match contested on November 30, 1979 for the WBC and The Ring welterweight titles.

Background
In late 1979 Top Rank promoter Bob Arum would organize a two-city boxing event (with one card apiece taking place in Nevada's Caesars Palace and New Orleans' Superdome) headlined by an anticipated bout between reigning WBC welterweight champion Wilfred Benítez and "Sugar" Ray Leonard. Benitez had won the title earlier in the year, becoming a 2-division champion at only 21 years old, whilst Leonard had won all 27 of his fights after turning pro following an Olympic gold medal in 1976 and had emerged as a top contender for the welterweight title and one of boxing's most popular fighters. In addition to the Benitez–Leonard bout, the card in also featured Vito Antuofermo defending his undisputed middleweight title against Marvin Hagler and a WBA light heavyweight title fight between Victor Galindez and Marvin Johnson 

Benítez's father and trainer Gregorio would write an article for The Ring magazine titled "Why Benitez Will Lose His Title" in which he claimed his son was not training hard enough for the fight and stating that he wouldn't work his son's corner "Even if they gave me $200,000." Gregorio would later admit that he had written the article to motivate his son for the fight. 

Benitez was scheduled to earn $1.2 million while Leonard would net $1 million, making their fight the richest non-heavyweight bout in boxing history at the time.

The fight
In a close, tactical fight, Leonard would ultimately score a technical knockout with only six seconds remaining in the 15th and final round. Leonard would score the only two knockdowns of the fight, first sending Benítez down on the seat of his pants with a well-timed left jab in the third round. The second would come in the 15th round. With Benítez behind on the scorecards, he fought aggressively though Leonard was able to hold his ground and go toe-to-toe with the champion. With 30 seconds remaining in the round Leonard a left uppercut sent Benítez down on his knees. Though clearly hurt, Benítez was able to get back up and continue, but after Leonard landed two more punches, the referee would stop the fight and Leonard was named the winner by technical knockout at 2:54 of round 15. At the time of the stoppage, Leonard was ahead on all three of the judge's scorecards with scores of 137–133, 137–130 and 136–134

Fight card

Caesars Palace (Paradise, Nevada)

Superdome (New Orleans, Louisiana)

References

1979 in boxing
Benitez
Boxing in Las Vegas
Caesars Palace